is a Japanese snowboarder, from Gose, Nara.

He won silver in the halfpipe at the 2013 FIS Snowboarding World Championships. In the 2014 Winter Olympics, he won a bronze in the halfpipe.
Later in 2014, he came in second behind American Taylor Gold in the Red Bull Double Pipe.

At the 2015 Winter X Games held in Aspen, Colorado Hiraoka won the Silver medal in the Superpipe in finishing second behind American snowboarder Danny Davis' Gold medal effort.

References

External links
 
 
 
 

Japanese male snowboarders
Living people
1995 births
Snowboarders at the 2014 Winter Olympics
Snowboarders at the 2018 Winter Olympics
Olympic snowboarders of Japan
Olympic bronze medalists for Japan
Medalists at the 2014 Winter Olympics
Olympic medalists in snowboarding
Snowboarders at the 2012 Winter Youth Olympics
X Games athletes
21st-century Japanese people